The Moașa (also: Moașa Sebeșului) is a right tributary of the river Sebeș in Romania. It discharges into the Sebeș close to its outflow into the Olt, near Racovița.

References

Rivers of Romania
Rivers of Sibiu County